"Something in the Walls" is the fifty-fourth episode (the nineteenth episode of the third season (1988–89) of the television series The Twilight Zone. In this episode, a sanitarium inmate sees faces watching her in any patterned clothing or furniture.

Plot
Dr. Mallory Craig, a new staff psychologist at Crest Ridge Sanitarium, becomes interested in patient Sharon Miles, who committed herself. She only wears solid colors, insists on staying in a room that is painted all white, repaints the room every time there is a crack or other flaw in the wall, and will not leave her room or attend counseling sessions. When an orderly brings her a blanket with a pattern on it, Sharon becomes hysterical. Dr. Craig has the orderly bring her white blankets instead.

The next day, Sharon apologizes for her outburst. Dr. Craig presses her to tell him what is frightening her. She discloses that lately she has begun seeing faces in patterns. Dr. Craig notes it is normal for the human brain to rationalize any sort of pattern into an image, but Sharon says the faces look back at her. In the next sessions, Sharon says that she is certain the faces have not yet decided what to do with her. In her dreams, she remembers the faces emerging from the wall, and she feared for her son. A message appeared on the wall: "Tell no one." When she awakes, Sharon calls Dr. Craig and tells him that she lied to him: she already knows what the faces want with her. She says she will tell him everything tomorrow and if something should happen to her, to protect her son.

When Dr. Craig arrives the next day, head nurse Becky Robb informs him that at midnight Sharon was screaming to be put into another room. They could not accommodate her request because the sanitarium is full, so they locked her in and eventually she quieted down. He finds Sharon. She is wearing complex clothing and tells him that it was selfish of her to abandon her family, and she is checking out of the asylum. She thanks him for curing her of her fears. Dr. Craig hears a faint voice and notices that there is a leak that formed a pattern in her ceiling from the storm the night before. After he leaves, the real Sharon manages to make her face appear in the rainwater pattern and repeatedly shouts "That's not me; it's one of them!" The new Sharon laughs, convinced the apparition is harmless.

External links

1989 American television episodes
The Twilight Zone (1985 TV series season 3) episodes

fr:La Métamorphose des murs